Paula Ann Franzese is an American legal scholar based in New Jersey who focuses on government ethics and property law. She is the Peter W. Rodino Professor of Law at the Seton Hall University School of Law. Franzese is an educator who has been named one of the 26 best law teachers in the United States. She is also a prominent advocate for government ethics reform, a spokesperson for legal education, a housing advocate, and an author.

Career
Franzese graduated summa cum laude, Phi Beta Kappa, with a Bachelor's degree from Barnard College, Columbia University. Franzese received a Juris Doctor degree from Columbia Law School and won several academic prizes, including the Rosenman Prize for excellence in public law courses. 

Franzese became a professor of law at Seton Hall Law School in 1986, and she later became the Peter W. Rodino Professor of Law at Seton Hall. In 2020, she was named one of the Top Women in Law by the New Jersey Law Journal.

Scholarship
Franzese's scholarship focuses on two main areas of the law: government ethics and property law. Her research into property law includes landlord-tenant reform, common interest communities including homeowners' boards, and affordable housing, including a legal analysis of the Mount Laurel doctrine. In addition to her scholarship, Franzese wrote two general-purpose guidebooks for students, including A Short & Happy Guide To Being A College Student and A Short & Happy Guide To Being A Law Student. Franzese has advocated for a right to counsel for low-income tenants facing eviction and moderated fair housing programs.

Franzese has written about the law as an instrument for social justice in the New Jersey Law Journal, has received national attention for her scholarship on the struggles of indigent tenants, and has been the recipient of numerous honors and awards, including the 2017 Justice Marie Garibaldi Award for Distinguished Service and Excellence. Her research and recommendations have been used by legislatures to formulate key ethics reform legislation.

Teaching
Franzese was featured as one of the 26 best law teachers in the nation in the book What the Best Law Teachers Do and has been named as an Exemplary Teacher by the American Association of Higher Education.  In 2019, the Seton Hall Student Bar Association's Professor of the Year Award was renamed the Paula A. Franzese Professor of the Year Award in her honor after she won the award 10 times. Franzese was recognized as one of twenty Inspiring Women in Education by SheKnows media for her volunteer efforts teaching middle school students civics and has presented on education as a human right at the UN International Human Rights Summit.  Franzese pioneered the cause of law-related and civic education during her tenure as President of the Justice Resource Center, the largest non-profit provider of law-related and civic education for grades four through twelve. Franzese also lectured for ten years at BarBri, a bar-exam preparation firm, serving as its national lecturer on property law. 

Franzese urges that law professors emphasize a "conceptual, contextual and empathetic understanding." Franzese encourages law students to have empathy with others as a way of better understanding the law and becoming more effective lawyers. At Seton Hall Law, she is the director of The Leadership Fellows Program. The Program includes "a distinguished speakers series, mentoring component and opportunities for experiential learning that include implementation of a community-based leadership project." She has written on the benefits of a J.D. degree and reasons to go to law school.

Ethics and Reform Advocacy
Franzese is an advocate of ethics reform. As Special Ethics Counsel, she and retired Justice Daniel J. O'Hern promulgated the Uniform Ethics Code in New Jersey, a pioneering statutory achievement that has become a model for national replication. She has published and presented on best practices for ethics reform and restoring the public trust. She received the National Council on Governmental Ethics Laws (COGEL) Award, the highest honor conferred by the organization, in recognition of her "significant, demonstrable and positive contributions to the fields of campaign finance, elections, ethics, freedom of information and lobbying over a significant period of time." 

In 2014 and again in 2016, Franzese criticized the administration of New Jersey Governor Chris Christie, stating that officials in the administration conflated their official duties with campaign efforts.

Publications

Law Review articles
 Promises Still to Keep: The Fair Housing Act Fifty Years Later, 40 Cardozo Law Review (2019)
 A Place to Call Home: Tenant Blacklisting and the Denial of Opportunity, 45 Fordham Urban Law Journal 661(2018)
 The Implied Warranty of Habitability Lives: Making Real the Promise of Landlord Tenant Reform, 68 Rutgers Law Review 1 (2017)
 The Power of Empathy in the Classroom, 47 Seton Hall Law Review 1 (2017)
 Empathic Teaching, Empathic Learning, 21 The Law Teacher 54 (2014)
 Law Teaching for the Conceptual Age, 44 Seton Hall Law Review 1 (2014)
 New Jersey Common Interest Communities: Predictors of Distress and an Agenda for Reform, 63 Rutgers Law Review 101 (2011)
 Reclaiming the Promise of the Judicial Branch: Toward a More Meaningful Standard of Judicial Review as Applied to New York Eminent Domain Law, 38 Fordham Urban Law Journal 1091 (2011)
 The Twin Rivers Case: Of Homeowners Associations, Free Speech Rights and Privatized Mini-Governments, 5 Rutgers Journal of Law & Public Policy 4 (2008)
 Trust and Community: The Common Interest Community as Metaphor and Paradox, 72 Univ. of Missouri Law Review 1110 (2007)
 Privatization and Its Discontents: Common Interest Communities and the Rise of Government for the "Nice.", 37 The Urban Lawyer 335 (2005)
 Restoring the Public Trust: An Agenda for Ethics Reform of State Government and a Proposed Model for New Jersey, 57 Rutgers Law Review 1175 (2005)
 Solutions to the Crisis in Affordable Housing: A Proposed Model for New York City, 3 Rutgers Journal of Law & Urban Policy 84 (2005)
 Audiotape and CD course on property law, Thomson, 2003.

Books and book chapters
 Housing and Hope: Private Property and Catholic Social Teachings, appearing in Christianity and Private Law (2019)
 Learning Core Commercial Law Concepts: Course Materials (West, 2018)
 A Short & Happy Guide to Sales (West, 2018)
 Street Smarts for Women Lawyers, NYC Bar Press (2016) (Contributing Author)
 Experiencing Property (West, 2015)
 A Short & Happy Guide To Being A Law Student.
 A Short & Happy Guide To Being A College Student
 Strategies and Techniques of Law School Teaching: Property (Aspen Publishing, 2012)
 A Short & Happy Guide To Property (Thompson, 2011)
 Property Law and the Public Interest, Third Edition (Lexis, 2007)
 Reaction and Reform in New Jersey, Ethics Reform Recommendations for The Executive Branch of New Jersey Government (Hall Institute, 2007) (with Justice Daniel J. O'Hern)
 The Affective Assistance of Counsel: Practicing Law As a Healing Profession (Carolina Academic Press, 2006)
 Residential Privilege: The Advent of the Guarded Subdivision, appearing in America's Second Gilded Age? Perspectives on Law and Class Differences (NYU Press, 2005)
 The Law According to Skyboxes (2005) (Contributor)
 Legends of the Law on Property, Thomson (2003)
Strategies and Techniques for Teaching Property, Aspen publishers.
Legend of the Law, Gilbert series, in property law, Harcourt Brace, 1996.

References

External links
Seton Hall Law School page
Franzese on Twitter

Living people
American legal scholars
Legal educators
Barnard College alumni
Columbia Law School alumni
American people of Italian descent
Seton Hall University School of Law faculty
Scholars of property law
People associated with Cahill Gordon & Reindel
Year of birth missing (living people)